Woodlawn Historic District may refer to:

in the United States
(by state)
 Woodlawn Historic District (Birmingham, Alabama), listed on the National Register of Historic Places (NRHP) in Alabama
 Woodlawn Highlands Historic District, Birmingham, AL, listed on the NRHP in Alabama
 Woodlawn Commercial Historic District, Birmingham, AL, listed on the NRHP in Alabama
 Woodlawn Historic District (Athens, Georgia), listed on the NRHP in Georgia
 Woodlawn Historic District (Lincolnton, Georgia), listed on the NRHP in Georgia
 Woodlawn Historic District (Iowa City, Iowa), listed on the NRHP in Iowa
 Woodlawn Historic District (Natchez, Mississippi), listed on the NRHP in Mississippi
Woodlawn Avenue Row, Buffalo, NY, listed on the NRHP in New York
Woodlawn (Alexandria, Virginia), listed on the NRHP in Virginia
 Woodlawn Historic and Archeological District, Port Conway, VA, listed on the NRHP in Virginia

See also
Woodlawn (disambiguation)
Woodlawn Cemetery (disambiguation)
Woodlawn Farm (disambiguation)